The 2014 Gomelsky Cup was a European basketball competition that happened between October 4 and October 5 in Moscow. CSKA Moscow was the champion.

Participants
  CSKA Moscow - host
  Nizhny Novgorod - Euroleague participant
  Panathinaikos - Euroleague participant
  Lietuvos rytas - Eurocup participant

Tournament

Semifinal 1

Semifinal 2

Third Place

First Place 

2014
2014–15 in Russian basketball
2014–15 in Lithuanian basketball
2014–15 in Greek basketball